

Postage rate 

For version of this table without cumulative inflation, see.

Basic domestic 
The basic postage rate for a small letter has increased over the years due to inflation but influenced in recent years by a complex interplay between Australia Post's monopoly over small items, and need to provide service to all Australian addresses at the mandated basic rate. 

In July 2009, Australia Post requested the Australian Competition and Consumer Commission (ACCC) to approve a stamp price rise in 2010 to 60 cents but the ACCC declined the approval of the price rise, however in April 2010, Australia Post resubmitted the proposed postal stamp rise. The ACCC approved this request on 28 May 2010 and it was published in the Government Gazette on 9 June 2010. 

On 26 December 2013, due to the heavy decline in mail usage due to competition from email, etc., Australia Post requested an increase in the base rate to 70c. 

On 4 January 2016, due to the heavy decline in mail usage due to competition from email, etc., Australia Post requested an increase in the base rate to $1.00.  

As of 1 February 2020, the base rate for domestic letters is now $1.10. The base rate of inflation is also shown (INF). 

The current base rate for domestic letters is $1.20 (since 3 January 2023).

 PR   INF    YEAR
 1d – 1.20 - 1911
 3d – 2.50 - 1950 (Equals 2.50¢)
 5d – 4.22 - 1959 (Equals 4.17¢)
 4¢ – 4.93 - 1966 (Introduction of decimal currency)
 5¢ – 5.10 - 1967
 6¢ – 5.59 - 1970
 7¢ – 5.93 - 1971
 10¢ – 7.91 - 1974
 18¢ – 9.11 - 1975
 20¢ – 12.52 - 1978
 22¢ – 15.04 - 1980
 24¢ – 16.47 - 1981
 27¢ – 18.35 - 1982
 30¢ – 20.18 - 1983
 36¢ – 24.44 - 1986
 37¢ – 26.51 - 1987
 39¢ – 28.42 - 1988
 
 41¢ – 20.55 - 1989
 43¢ – 32.78 - 1990 (effective 3 September 1990)
 45¢ – 34.17 - 1992 (effective 2 January 1992)
 45¢ – 52.42 - 2000 (effective 1 July 2000. With the introduction of the GST, the postage component was decreased to absorb the new GST cost, so for the public there was no change in stamp prices. For businesses the GST claimable component of the postage rate was 4¢, leaving a reduced cost to business users of just 41¢.
 50¢ – 45.10 - 2003 (effective 13 January 2003)
 55¢ – 52.42 - 2008 (effective 1 September 2008)
 60¢ – 54.91 - 2010 (effective 28 June 2010)
 70¢ – 60.61 - 2014 (effective 31 March 2014)
 $1.00 – 62.32 - 2016 (effective 4 January 2016)
 $1.10 – 66.27 - 2020 (effective 1 February 2020)
 $1.20 - ??.?? - now (effective 3 January 2023)

Large letters 
Since about 2005, larger letters have been charged a round multiple of the base postage rate, which is helpful to customers if they do not have stocks of the more expensive stamps.

260 x 360 x 20mm – Up to 125g – $2.20
260 x 360 x 20mm – Up to 250g – $3.30
260 x 360 x 20mm – Up to 500g – $5.50
A large letter, including packaging, cannot be more than 20mm thick or larger than 260x360mm, otherwise it will be considered a parcel, which as of 2019 costs a minimum of $8.30 (up to 500 grams).

References 

A
Postal history of Australia